Abdullahi Audu Sule (born 26 December 1959) is a Nigerian engineer, businessman and politician who has served as governor of Nasarawa State since 2019. He was elected in the 2019 Governorship election under the platform of the All Progressives Congress (APC).

Early life and education 
Abdullahi Audu Sule was born on 26 December 1959, in Akwanga-West Development Area of present day Nasarawa State. His early schooling was at Roman Catholic Mission (RMC) Primary School, Gudi Station in 1968. He then enrolled in Zang Secondary School in 1974 and later Government Technical College, Bukuru in 1977. After his secondary education, he went to Plateau State Polytechnic, in Barkin Ladi in 1980. He then left Nigeria on a scholarship to study at Indiana University, Terre Haute, Indiana, United States where he obtained a Bachelor of Science in Mechanical Technology and a master's degree in Industrial Technology.

Career 
Returning to Nigeria in 1985, Sule served as a youth corps member with Plateau Utilities Board. He later joined the Jos Steel Rolling Mill in 1985 as a Production Engineer. Returning to the United States in 1989, he worked for several companies (Lancer Corporation, OEM component and Osyka Corporation among others) before returning to Nigeria in 2000. On his return to Nigeria, he co-founded Sadiq Petroleum Nigeria Limited in Lagos and was made the managing director/CEO. Under his leadership, the company won a bid to acquire African Petroleum (AP) Plc and he became the CEO of AP in 2001.

On June 21, prior to his gubernatorial ambition in 2018, Dangote Sugar Refinery Plc. announced Abdullahi Sule as the substantive Group Managing Director (GMD) of the Company.

Politics 
He won the gubernatorial primaries for Nasarawa State of the All Progressives Congress on 1 October 2018.

On 10 March 2019, he was declared governor-elect of Nasarawa State at the 2019 Nasarawa gubernatorial election held on 9 March 2019. He was sworn in on 29 May 2019.

See also 
List of Governors of Nasarawa State

References 

1959 births
Living people
Nigerian businesspeople
Governors of Nasarawa State
Indiana University alumni
All Progressives Congress politicians
People from Nasarawa State